Kaban is a rural locality in the Tablelands Region, Queensland, Australia.

History 
The locality takes its name from the former railway station; it is an Aboriginal word, meaning place of the sugar glider.

References 

Tablelands Region
Localities in Queensland